Lucas Emanuel Acosta (born January 26, 1988) is an Argentine football midfielder.

He made his professional debut while playing for Colón de Santa Fe on August 5, 2006 in a 4–1 home defeat Independiente. In July 2011, he was transferred to newly promoted San Martín de San Juan, who later loaned him to Ecuadorian-club LDU Quito for a year.

References

External links
 Lucas Acosta at BDFA
 Argentine Primera statistics  
 

1988 births
Living people
Footballers from Santa Fe, Argentina
Argentine expatriate footballers
Argentine footballers
Association football midfielders
Club Atlético Colón footballers
L.D.U. Quito footballers
Boca Unidos footballers
O'Higgins F.C. footballers
Gimnasia y Esgrima de Jujuy footballers
Sarmiento de Resistencia footballers
Flandria footballers
Racing Club de Montevideo players
Juventud Antoniana footballers
Deportivo Sanarate F.C. players
Huracán de Comodoro Rivadavia footballers
Chilean Primera División players
Argentine Primera División players
Argentine expatriate sportspeople in Chile
Argentine expatriate sportspeople in Ecuador
Argentine expatriate sportspeople in Uruguay
Argentine expatriate sportspeople in Guatemala
Expatriate footballers in Chile
Expatriate footballers in Ecuador
Expatriate footballers in Uruguay
Expatriate footballers in Guatemala